Iris Vianey Mendoza Mendoza (born 26 August 1981) is a Mexican politician and lawyer affiliated with the PRD. She currently serves as Senator of the LXII Legislature of the Mexican Congress.

References

1981 births
Living people
People from Apatzingán
Politicians from Michoacán
21st-century Mexican lawyers
Women members of the Senate of the Republic (Mexico)
Members of the Senate of the Republic (Mexico)
Party of the Democratic Revolution politicians
Mexican women lawyers
21st-century Mexican politicians
21st-century Mexican women politicians
Universidad Michoacana de San Nicolás de Hidalgo alumni